A role model is a person whose behaviour, example, or success is or can be emulated by others, especially by younger people. The term role model is credited to sociologist Robert K. Merton, who hypothesized that individuals compare themselves with reference groups of people who occupy the social role to which the individual aspires., an example of which is the way young fans may idolize and imitate professional athletes or entertainment artists.

In the second half of the twentieth century, U.S. advocates for workplace equity popularized the term and concept of role models as part of a larger social capital lexicon—which also includes terms such as glass ceiling, networking, mentoring, and gatekeeper—serving to identify and address the problems barring non-dominant groups from professional success. Mainstream business literature subsequently adopted the terms and concepts, promoting them as pathways to success for all career climbers. In 1970 these terms were not in the general American vocabulary; by the mid-1990s they had become part of everyday speech. Although the term role model has been criticized more recently as "outdated", the term and its associated responsibility remains prominent in the public consciousness as a commonly used phrase, and a "powerful presence" in the entertainment industry and media.

Role models can also be national. for example, Chilean politicians and intellectuals had France as the prime role model during much of the 19th century until they shifted to Germany in the last decades of the century. In short, a role model is a person looked to by others as an example to be imitated.

Effect on career opportunity and choice 

According to historian Pamela  Laird, a person's chosen role models may have a considerable impact on his or her career opportunities and choices. The suitability of a role model depends, in part, on the admirer’s perceived commonality with the model, who should provide an image of an ambitious yet realistic goal. For example, Laird suggests that, Benjamin Franklin served as the role model for countless nineteenth-century white businessmen, including notables such as Thomas Mellon, B.F. Goodrich, and Frederick Weyerhäuser. Laird suggests that the lack of commonalities between potential role models and would-be admirers helped perpetuate barriers to American minorities and women as they tried to advance in a business world dominated by white men, thus spurring late twentieth-century efforts to develop suitable role models for these groups.

Parent role models also significantly influence a person's "education and training aspirations, task self-efficacy, and expectancy for an entrepreneurial career".

Celebrity role models

The ever-widening reach of the media in popular culture has elevated certain celebrities to worldwide acclaim. This boom of media coverage and constant exposure to these individuals resulted in a change of mindset toward celebrities in both adults and youth alike. According to a survey of teachers in the United Kingdom conducted in 2008 by the Association of Teachers and Lecturers, young people most frequently chose sports stars as role models, followed by pop stars. Many, however, simply aspired to be "famous for being famous", believing that fame and fortune could be easily accessed through reality television.

Community role models

According to Rita Pierson, teachers, because of the large amount of time spent with children, have such a huge impact on children that they're being advised to be likeable in order to build strong emotional relationships with children.

Athlete role models
There is significant discussion as to whether athletes should be considered role models. Some athletes have been asked to behave as if they were role models for their local communities, and some such as Hank Greenberg have deliberately tried to set a good example but generally regarding athletes as role models has been criticised due to their appointment often being based solely on sporting ability rather than any morality – it has been suggested that the discipline and control shown continuously by sportspeople on the field leads to a belief from viewers that these same qualities are continuously shown off the field. These and other factors such as the elements of competition, excitement and success are what make people want to emulate them.
Charles Barkley has stated that he believes athletes are not the figures that children should be emulating and that it is the parent's responsibility to be role models, that the role is deliberately applied by the media out of jealousy in order to make life more difficult for sportspeople, and that it sets up the sportspeople as an unattainable target for most.

See also

Celebrity
Identification (psychology)
Role engulfment

References

Model
Socialization
Social influence
Robert K. Merton